Saint-Désiré is a commune in the Allier department in Auvergne-Rhône-Alpes in central France.

Population

See also
Communes of the Allier department

References

External links
Postcards from the 19th century

Communes of Allier
Allier communes articles needing translation from French Wikipedia